Cerautola hewitsoni is a butterfly in the family Lycaenidae. It is found in Cameroon, the Republic of the Congo and the Central African Republic.

References

Butterflies described in 1877
Poritiinae
Butterflies of Africa
Taxa named by Paul Mabille